The 1941 World Professional Basketball Tournament was the 3rd edition of the World Professional Basketball Tournament. It was held in Chicago, Illinois, during the days of 15–19 March 1941 and featured 15 teams. It was won by the Detroit Eagles who defeated the Oshkosh All-Stars 39–37 in the championship game. The New York Rens came in third after beating the Toledo White Huts 57–42 in the third-place game. Buddy Jeannette of the Detroit Eagles was named the tournaments Most Valuable Player.

Results

First round

Chicago v Davenport

Detroit v Indianapolis

Harlem v Newark

Oshkosh v Fort Wayne

New York v Dayton

Kenosha v Rochester

Toledo v Sheboygan

Philadelphia v Bismark

Quarter-finals

Detroit v Harlem

Toledo v Chicago

New York v Kenosha

Oshkosh v Philadelphia

Semi-finals

Oshkosh v Toledo

Detroit v New York

Third place game

Championship game

Individual awards

All-Tournament team
F – Chuck Chuckovits, Toledo White Huts 
F – Dolly King, New York Rens
C – Ed Sadowski, Detroit Eagles
G – Bob Carpenter, Oshkosh All-Stars
G – Buddy Jeannette, Detroit Eagles (MVP)

References

External links
WPBT 1939-48 on apbr.org

World Professional Basketball Tournament